Magnetic Resonance in Medicine is a monthly peer-reviewed medical journal covering research on all aspects of the development and use of nuclear magnetic resonance and electron paramagnetic resonance techniques for medical applications. It was established in 1984 and is published by Wiley on behalf of the International Society for Magnetic Resonance in Medicine.

External links 

Medical physics journals
Monthly journals
Wiley-Blackwell academic journals
English-language journals
Publications established in 1984
Radiology and medical imaging journals